Statland Church is a parish church of the Church of Norway in Namsos municipality in Trøndelag county, Norway. It is located in the village of Statland. It is the church for the Statland parish which is part of the Namdal prosti (deanery) in the Diocese of Nidaros. The white, wooden church was built in a long church style in 1992 using plans drawn up by the architect Reidar Moholdt. The church seats about 140 people. The church was consecrated on 10 May 1992 by Bishop Finn Wagle.

See also
List of churches in Nidaros

References

Namsos
Churches in Trøndelag
Long churches in Norway
Wooden churches in Norway
20th-century Church of Norway church buildings
Churches completed in 1992
1992 establishments in Norway